Joseph Pugh (born 10 October 1997) is a footballer who plays as a forward for Tadcaster Albion in the Northern Premier League.

He began his professional career with Doncaster Rovers.

Early life 
Pugh is the son of former midfielder Daral Pugh. He was initially enrolled in Hull City academy, but moved to Doncaster Rovers to play for his local team and in a bid to start enjoying his football again.

Career

Club 
Pugh was an unused substitute for Doncaster Rovers on 8 May 2016, in a League One match against Burton Albion at the Keepmoat Stadium. His first appearance came from the bench in an EFL Trophy match against Mansfield Town which Rovers won 2–0. He has had loan spells at Hyde United, Boston United and Frickley Athletic. He was released following a disappointing campaign.

He signed for North Ferriby United on 26 June 2017.

International 
Pugh is eligible for both England and Wales.

In March 2012 he took part in a Wales under 16 training camp.

Career statistics

References

External links

1997 births
Living people
Association football forwards
Doncaster Rovers F.C. players
Hyde United F.C. players
Boston United F.C. players
Frickley Athletic F.C. players
English Football League players
National League (English football) players
Footballers from Doncaster
North Ferriby United A.F.C. players
Tadcaster Albion A.F.C. players
Northern Premier League players
English footballers